Spill the Beans is an EP released in 1994 by New Zealand band The Bats.

The EP was released in two versions - a 3-track 7" and a 5-track CD. The 7" included a live version of "Sir Queen", from their 1987 album, Daddy's Highway, which was recorded live-to-air on WFMU, East Orange, New Jersey in July 1993.

Unusually, band members Paul Kean and Kaye Woodward swapped roles for two of the tracks, Kean playing guitar and Woodward bass on "Spill The Beans" and "Give In To The Sands".

Track listing

Personnel
Malcolm Grant - drums
Paul Kean - bass, vocals
Robert Scott - guitar, lead vocals
Kaye Woodward - guitar, vocals

Also credited:
Mac McCaughan - wah guitar ("Empty Head")
Brad Morrison - engineer ("Sir Queen (Live)")
Arnie Van Bussel - engineer ("Under the Law")

References

1994 EPs
The Bats (New Zealand band) albums
Flying Nun Records EPs
Flying Nun Records singles